This is the list of members of the Election Committee elected in the 2016 Election Committee subsector elections. It serves from 2017 to 2021 and is responsible for electing the Chief Executive of Hong Kong in the 2017 election. By March 2017, there is a total number of 1,194 members in the 1,200-strong Election Committee, in which one is vacated in the Import and Export subsector and two vacated in the Legislative Council due to the disqualification of two Legislative Council members, as well as three overlapped memberships of Martin Liao, Ma Fung-kwok and Michael Tien who are both Legislative Council members and Hong Kong deputies of the National People's Congress.

The tag behind each member indicates the candidate each member nominates in the 2017 election:  Carrie Lam;  John Tsang;  Woo Kwok-hing.

First Sector

Catering

Commercial (First)

Commercial (Second)

Employers' Federation of Hong Kong

Finance

Financial Services

Hong Kong Chinese Enterprises Association

Hotel

Import and Export

Industrial (First)

Industrial (Second)

Insurance

Real Estate and Construction

Textiles and Garment

Tourism

Transport

Wholesale and Retail

Second Sector

Accountancy

Architectural, Surveying, Planning and Landscape

Chinese Medicine

Education

Engineering

Health Services

Higher Education

Information Technology

Legal

Medical

Third Sector

Agriculture and Fisheries

Labour

Social Welfare

Religious

Catholic Diocese of Hong Kong

Chinese Muslim Cultural and Fraternal Association

Hong Kong Christian Council

Hong Kong Taoist Association

Confucian Academy

Hong Kong Buddhist Association

Sports, Performing Arts, Culture and Publication

Sports

Performing Arts

Culture

Publication

Fourth Sector

National People's Congress (ex officio)

Legislative Council (ex officio)

Chinese People's Political Consultative Conference

Heung Yee Kuk

Hong Kong and Kowloon District Councils

New Territories District Councils

References
 2016 Election Committee Subsector Elections Official Website

2017 Hong Kong Chief Executive election